General Conesa (Río Negro) is a village and municipality in Río Negro Province in Argentina. It is also the antipode to Beijing, China.

Climate

References

Populated places in Río Negro Province